Sam Maloof (January 24, 1916 – May 21, 2009) was a furniture designer and woodworker. Maloof's work is in the collections of several major American museums, including the Metropolitan Museum of Art, the Los Angeles County Museum of Art, the Philadelphia Museum of Art, and the Smithsonian American Art Museum. Maloof, the first craftsman to receive a MacArthur fellowship,  was described by The New York Times as  "a central figure in the postwar American crafts movement".

Early life and education
Maloof was born Samuel Solomon Maloof, a member of the large Maalouf family, in Chino, California, to Lebanese immigrants.  Maloof's father, Slimen Nasif Nadir Maloof, and mother, Anisse, had immigrated to the U.S. in 1905 from Lebanon, which was at that time a region of the Ottoman Empire. Maloof learned to speak Spanish from a Mexican-born housekeeper and Arabic from his parents even before he learned English. He was engaged in woodworking even as a child, made a broad spatula for his mother for turning bread, carved dollhouse furniture, cars and other toys. He attended high school first at Chaffey High School in Ontario, California, where he took his first woodworking class and was recognized by his art teacher as having extraordinary skill. Later he attended Chino High School.

Career
Shortly after completing high school, Maloof began working in the art department of the Vortox Manufacturing Company in Claremont, California. He was drafted into the United States Army on October 11, 1941.  Maloof was soon promoted from private to master sergeant while doing display work in Alaska. He was one of 35,000 WW II troops sent to protect Alaska from the Japanese, an engagement the Allies expected to be a "bloodbath." In actuality, the Japanese forces had left Kiska before the Allies arrived. Maloof was one of the few soldiers who had a camera, and while not trained as a photographer, Maloof took 1,800 photographs which were "alive and clear and informative."

After completing his service, Maloof left the army in 1945 to return to Southern California. In 1946, Maloof became reacquainted with Millard Sheets while he was doing screen printing for Angelus-Pacific. Sheets invited Maloof to come to Claremont, California to work for him and become his studio assistant.

In 1947, while waiting for Millard Sheets at Scripps College, Maloof met Alfreda Ward.   Alfreda was on leave from the her job at the Indian Service where she developed and administered arts and crafts programs.  It was love at first sight.

Maloof married Alfreda Ward on June 27, 1948 and the couple moved into a house at 921 Plaza Serena, Ontario, California, where Sam set up a furniture workshop in the garage. Mostly from necessity, Maloof designed and built a suite of furniture for his home using salvaged materials.   Commissioned pieces followed and, from 1949 to 1952, Maloof continued working in the garage of his Ontario home. In 1953, Maloof relocated to Alta Loma, California. Over time, he added 16 rooms, including a furniture-making shop and studio, to the original 6-room house. In 2000, when the path of the new CA-210 freeway extension included the Maloof property, the home was moved about 3 miles to its current location at 5131 Carnelian Street (at the northeast corner of the intersection with Hidden Farm Road). The Sam and Alfreda Maloof Compound serves as the office of the Sam and Alfreda Maloof Foundation for Arts and Crafts which offers tours of the Historic Home on Thursdays and Saturdays.

President Jimmy Carter came to his home and signed a photograph that said, "to my woodworking hero." The White House has several of the rocking chairs Maloof designed.

Maloof's work is in the collections of several major American museums, including the Metropolitan Museum of Art, the Los Angeles County Museum of Art, the Philadelphia Museum of Art, and the Smithsonian American Art Museum. In 1985 he was awarded a MacArthur "Genius" grant. Presidents Jimmy Carter and Ronald Reagan have both owned Maloof rockers. He is featured in the 2007 PBS series "Craft in America: Memory, Landscape, Community", produced by Carol Sauvion.

Maloof's chairs, for which he is perhaps most famous, have a sculptural quality about them, yet are also very ergonomic, and austere in their simplicity. They can be characterized by completely rounded over corners at mortise and tenon joints (which are always plainly visible); carved ridges and spines, particularly on the arm rests; decorative Ebony dowels; deep, dished-out seats (always made from several boards glued together); and clear finishes.

Maloof tended to favor only a handful of woods: Claro Walnut, Cherry, Oak, Rosewood and Yew. On larger pieces, he often used Poplar in areas that would not be visible during ordinary use.

He was described by the Smithsonian Institution as "America's most renowned contemporary furniture craftsman" and People magazine dubbed him "The Hemingway of Hardwood." But his business card always said "woodworker." "I like the word," he told a Los Angeles Times reporter, his eyes brightening behind large, owl-eyed glass frames. "It's an honest word."

In 1985 Mr. Maloof became the first craftsman to receive a MacArthur fellowship; and despite such recognition, he declined to identify himself as an artist. His autobiography was titled Sam Maloof: Woodworker.

Death 
Maloof died at the age of 93 on May 21, 2009 at his home in the Alta Loma section of Rancho Cucamonga, California.

References

Sources
 Head, Jeffrey. "The Collector & The Craftsman," Palm Springs Modernism (February 2006), pp. 34–35.
  Maloof, Sam. (1983). Sam Maloof: Woodworker. Tokyo: Kodansha International. ;  OCLC 9646251

External links

"A Visit with Sam Maloof" - D.J. Marks
Sam and Alfreda Maloof Foundation for Arts and Crafts
Gallery of Pictures of Projects Inspired by Sam Maloof showcased in Fine Woodworking magazine
Video Library: A Woodworking Experience with Sam Maloof - at the Wood Working Channel
Sam Maloof dies at 93; designer and builder of simple, beautiful furniture-Los Angeles Times
Sam Maloof dies at 93; A look inside his workshop
Sam Maloof: 1916-2009 Fine Woodworking magazine's tribute to Sam Maloof with photos and video''.
.

American furniture designers
American furniture makers
American woodworkers
Artists from California
MacArthur Fellows
1916 births
2009 deaths
California people in design
American people of Lebanese descent
People from Chino, California
People from Ontario, California
People from Alta Loma, Rancho Cucamonga, California
20th-century American artists